The men's tournament of football at the 2017 Summer Universiade was held from August 18 to 29 in Taipei, Taiwan.

Teams

Preliminary round
All times are Taiwan Standard Time (UTC+08:00).
Tiebreakers
The ranking of each team in each group was determined as follows:
Greatest number of points obtained in group matches;
Goal difference in all group matches;
Greatest number of goals scored in all group matches;
Greatest number of points obtained in group matches between the teams concerned;
Greatest number of goals scored in the group matches between the teams concerned;
Fair play points system taking into account the number of yellow and red cards in all group matches;
Drawing of lots by the Technical Committee.

Group A

Group B

Group C

Group D

Classification round

9th–16th place quarterfinals

13th–16th place semifinals

9th–12th place semifinals

15th place match

13th place match

11th place match

9th place match

Elimination round

Quarterfinals

5th–8th place semifinals

Semifinals

7th place match

5th place match

Bronze medal match

Gold medal match

Final standings

References

External links
 2017 Summer Universiade – Football – Men's tournament 

Men's